Clathrin interactor 1 (CLINT1), also known as EPSIN4, is a protein which in humans is encoded by the CLINT1 gene.

Function 

The CLINT1 protein binds to the terminal domain of the clathrin heavy chain and stimulates clathrin cage vesicle assembly. Clathrin coated vesicles enable neurotransmitter receptors and other proteins to be endocytosed or taken up across neuronal membranes and across the membranes of other types of cells. This enables a turnover of neuroreceptors or other proteins to be maintained and thus the numbers of receptors can be fine tuned.

Clinical significance 
The CLINT1 gene has been shown to be involved in the genetic aetiology of schizophrenia in four studies  It is known that the  antipsychotic drugs chlorpromazine and clozapine stabilise clathrin coated vesicles and this may be one reason why antipsychotic drugs are effective in treating delusions, auditory hallucinations and many of the other symptoms of schizophrenia.

Interactions
CLINT1 has been shown to interact with GGA2.

References

External links

Further reading